Campus El Segundo Athletic Fields is an outdoor athletic field in El Segundo, California. The park was opened in 2007, by English International footballer David Beckham and French International footballer Zinedine Zidane.

The facility can be easily accessed from the Mariposa station, located across the street from the fieldsn.

Located near Campus El Segundo is Toyota Sports Center a practice facility for the Los Angeles Kings, which contains a NHL sized ice rink.

The Edge 
Part of Campus El Segundo The Edge at Campus El Segundo is a 220,000 square foot (14 acres) high-quality business park with 15 two-story buildings and 20,000 SF of support retail it is currently being developed by Mar Ventures, Inc. and AMB Property Corporation. Located in El Segundo, 801 Parkview Drive North has convenient access to the beach communities from Palos Verdes to Santa Monica, a direct on-ramp to the 105 Freeway with the San Diego 405 Freeway approximately one mile away and proximity to both LAX and the Metro Greenline Rail. The building size and number of window openings, filled with high-performance glass, coupled with aluminum composite panels, cornices and canopies make the buildings aesthetically pleasing. Many observers have noted they find it hard to believe the buildings are tilt-up.

Usage

Soccer

The prime usage of the field is soccer. Many teams use Campus as their training ground.

Lacrosse
Is the home of the Pacific Edge Lacrosse Association (PELA) and many recreational lacrosse players use Campus El Segundo to practice or play.

American football
Many football players practice or play games at Campus El Segundo.

Rules 
No food or drink (other than water) on the fields. Food/drink is allowed on cement areas. 
No seeds or shelled snacks on the fields (i.e. sunflower, peanuts, etc.).
No chewing gum on the fields. 
No glass on the fields
No smoking or tobacco products on the fields.
No alcohol on the facility.
No animals on the fields.
No metal spiked cleats on the fields
All footwear on the fields must be free of mud, grease, etc.
No items that might puncture the turf allowed on the fields (i.e. no in-ground field markers, poles, stakes, etc.). 
No marking or painting the fields without approval from the City of El Segundo.
No hanging or climbing on the field goals or netting.
No items such as tables, booths, etc. allowed on the fields without approval from the City of El Segundo.
No fire, fireworks, barbecues on the facility without approval from the City of El Segundo. 
No motorized vehicles on the facility without approval from the City of El Segundo.
No riding skateboards, roller blades, scooters, bikes, and no golf allowed. 
No littering

References
Notes

External links
Campus El Segundo Athletic fields Information
Official Facebook Page
Official Four Square

2007 establishments in California
Landmarks in Los Angeles
Sports venues in Greater Los Angeles
Sports venues in Los Angeles County, California
Sports venues completed in 2007
American football venues in California
Lacrosse venues in California
Soccer venues in California